The Amazon-class frigates of 1773, made up of 32-gun fifth rates with a main battery of 12-pounder guns. They were designed by the Surveyor of the Navy, John Williams during his employment by the Admiralty.

The class comprised eighteen ships; Amazon, Ambuscade and Thetis were launched in 1773; the second batch - Cleopatra, Amphion, Orpheus, Juno, Success, Iphigenia, Andromache, Syren, Iris, Greyhound, Meleager, Solebay, Terpsichore and Blonde - were launched in 1779 to 1787

References

Fifth-rate frigates of the Royal Navy
1773 ships